Colonel Sidney Arnold Pakeman, CBE, MC, ED (4 January 1891 – 15 June 1975) was a British academic and a member of the Parliament of Ceylon.

Early life and education
Sidney Arnold Pakeman was born in Bristol, England on 1 April 1891, the son of Thomas Lovell Pakeman, a draper and undertaker. He attended Bristol Grammar School between 1903 and 1910.

Military service
He served in the British Army in the Wiltshire Regiment 4th Battalion, attached to the Gloucestershire Regiment, during the First World War. On the 18 June 1917 he was awarded the Military Cross as a lieutenant for conspicuous gallantry and devotion to duty. He led his company in the most gallant manner and personally tried to cut gaps in the enemy’s wire. Later, although wounded, he remained at his post during a battle on 6–7 April 1917 at Maissemy, France.

Academic career
He obtained a Master of Arts degree from Sidney Sussex College, Cambridge and joined the Ceylon University College in 1921 serving as lecturer and thereafter Professor of Modern History and Economics until 1942.

Ceylon Defence Force
He joined the Ceylon Defence Force as a volunteer officer in the Ceylon Cadet Battalion. Promoted to Brevet Colonel, he served as the Commanding officer of the Ceylon Cadet Battalion from 1932 to 1938 and was confirmed in the rank of colonel. In 1937 he received an OBE (Military Division) for his role as Officer Commanding, Ceylon Cadet Battalion, Ceylon Defence Force.

Parliament
Following Ceylon's first parliamentary elections in 1947, Pakeman was appointed as a member of the Ceylon House of Representatives. He was one of six members appointed by the Governor-General, to represent important interests which were not represented or inadequately represented in the House.

In the 1951 King's Birthday Honours Pakeman was awarded a CBE (Civil Division) for his service as a member of parliament and as a professor at the Ceylon University College.

Bibliography

References

1891 births
1975 deaths
Academics from Bristol
People educated at Bristol Grammar School
Alumni of Sidney Sussex College, Cambridge
Academic staff of the Ceylon University College
Recipients of the Military Cross
Members of the 1st Parliament of Ceylon
Ceylonese Commanders of the Order of the British Empire
Sri Lankan people of English descent
Gloucestershire Regiment officers
Sri Lankan Cadet Corps officers
Ceylonese colonels